Tuglak is a 2012 Indian Kannada-language film directed by Aravind Kaushik, starring Rakshit Shetty, Meghana Gaonkar and Anisha Ummer.

Cast

 Rakshit Shetty as Raaghu
 Meghana Gaonkar as Sonia
 Anisha Ummer as Sania
 B. Suresha as a don
 Giri
 Balu Nagendra
 Venkat Shastry
 Kailash
 Rishab Shetty
 Vaijanath Biradar
 Bank Janardhan

Music

Reception

Critical response 

R G Vijayasarathy of Rediff.com scored the film at 2.5 out of 5 stars and says "Arjun's music is passable. Camerawork by Manu Apler is a major highlight of the film. The film could have been more engaging and interesting". Bangalore Mirror wrote "Anisha Umar, in her first Kannada film, is passable and Meghana has just  added another film to her list. B Suresha in the role of a don is neither scary or funny. The camerawork and the editing where the cuts are invisible are the plus points of the film. Otherwise, the director should take the blame. Period". Deccan Herald wrote "“Tuglak” lives up to its title. An effort that holds itself back just short of brilliance, “Tuglak” simplifies the dilemma many face, but leaves the audience dissatisfied. Just as the sultan of yore, perhaps?"

References

2012 drama films
2010s Kannada-language films
2012 films
Indian drama films
Films directed by Aravind Kaushik